Angels & Insects is a 1995 romantic drama film directed by Philip Haas and starring Mark Rylance, Patsy Kensit, and Kristin Scott Thomas. It was written by Philip and Belinda Haas with A. S. Byatt after her 1992 novella Morpho Eugenia (included in her book Angels and Insects). The film received an Academy Award nomination for Best Costume Design.

Plot
William Adamson (Mark Rylance), a naturalist, returns to Victorian England, staying with his benefactor, Sir Harold Alabaster (Jeremy Kemp), a wealthy Baronet. He has lost his possessions in a shipwreck, returning from an extended expedition to the Amazon. Now dependent upon his patron, William is employed to catalog Sir Harold's specimen collection and teach his younger children the natural sciences, assisting their governess, the unassuming Matty Crompton (Kristin Scott Thomas).

William becomes enamoured of Sir Harold's eldest daughter, Eugenia (Patsy Kensit). Eugenia is softly spoken, anxious, and mourning the recent death of her fiancé. Despite his impoverishment, Eugenia proves receptive and accepts his marriage proposal. Although Sir Harold grants his approval, Eugenia's snobbish and spoilt brother, Edgar, (Douglas Henshall) dislikes William's humble origins.

Soon after the marriage, Eugenia becomes pregnant. Eugenia's behaviour alternates between coldness, locking William out of her room, and intense sexual passion. The couple has four more children. She calls the one son, 'Edgar', in the family tradition, annoying William. He spends much of his time with the Alabaster children and Matty, observing an ant colony in the forest, with a view to writing a book. Returning via the stables from an excursion, William discovers Edgar raping a teenage servant. Edgar tells William that she consented, but she is clearly terrified. William forms a bond with Matty, who encourages his scientific activities and displays a strong intelligence. The book is successfully published.

One day, William is summoned from the hunt to the house by a servant who claims Eugenia wants him. Entering the bedroom, he finds Eugenia and Edgar engaging in incestuous sex. Eugenia confesses that this has occurred since childhood and that her fiancé committed suicide in consequence. She says that when it started she was too young to understand but, after she saw herself through the eyes of her fiancé, she felt guilty. In tears, Eugenia explains that she tried to stop, but that Edgar's will was too strong. William realises that he has been used to conceal the incest and that the children (who bear no resemblance to him) are Edgar's.

Matty reveals her knowledge of the affair to William during a Scrabble-like game. Later, she explains that the servants were also aware and arranged for him to find out. Expressing frustration at her life and dependency on the Alabasters, Matty reveals that she has published her own book on the insects and has bought tickets for a ship for the Amazon. William is reluctant; despite his attraction, he feels that the rain forest is unsuitable for a woman. After she assures him of her strength and love for him, William acquiesces.

Before leaving, William meets Eugenia and tells her he intends never to return but will continue to financially support their children. He also promises to keep her secret, for fear of injuring her ailing father, and hopes she may find a way to live with her guilt. William and Matty depart in a coach for Liverpool, eager to begin their new adventure and leave the past behind.

Cast
 Mark Rylance as William Adamson
 Kristin Scott Thomas as Matty Crompton
 Patsy Kensit as Eugenia Alabaster Adamson
 Jeremy Kemp as Sir Harald Alabaster
 Douglas Henshall as Edgar Alabaster
 Annette Badland as Lady Alabaster
 Chris Larkin as Robin
 Anna Massey as Miss Mead
 Saskia Wickham as Rowena Alabaster
 Lindsay Thomas as Lady Alabaster's Maid
 Michelle Sylvester as Margaret Alabaster
 Clare Lovell as Elaine Alabaster
 Jenny Lovell as Edith Alabaster
 Oona Haas as Alice Alabaster
 Angus Hodder as Guy Alabaster
 John Veasey as Arthur

Production
The film was made on location at Arbury Hall in Nuneaton, Warwickshire, the home of the 3rd Viscount Daventry. The costumes worn by Kensit and the other actresses were designed in bright colors and bold patterns to evoke the appearance of insects, which would earn the film an Academy Award nomination for Best Costume Design. In the marriage proposal scene, Patsy Kensit's gown was treated with female sex hormones to attract the moths to her. 6,000 ants were brought in initially for the forest colony scenes, but they walked off before filming. Another 6,000 were brought in as a replacement, only for the original 6,000 to return.

Release and reception
The film was entered into competition at the Cannes Film Festival in May 1995 and screened at the London Film Festival on 5 November. It received a limited release in the US on 26 January 1996. Critical reception was very strong, with the performances and production values being particularly praised. Janet Maslin claimed the film had "...formidable intensity and haunting beauty" and Roger Ebert awarded it 3.5 Stars. Edward Guthmann of the San Francisco Chronicle thought that Haas directed the film "...with elegance and control, and seasons the sexier, more melodramatic elements of his tale with subtle, slightly mocking irony."

Time Out concluded that Angels and Insects "...is not your average period drama...the costumes, design, music and camerawork steer clear of naturalism, highlighting both the modernity of the approach and the notions of humans as creatures to be observed dispassionately. Despite some uneven pacing and variability in performance, this is a work of clarity, ambition and intelligence."

In the US the film was released on VHS on 21 February 2000, on DVD 19 March 2002. In the UK the film was released on 3 February 2003 on both DVD and VHS.

Awards
 Nominated - Academy Award (1997) for Best Costume Design (Paul Brown)
 Nominated - Cannes Film Festival (1995) for the Golden Palm for Best Director (Philip Haas)
 Won - Evening Standard British Film Award (1996) for Best Actress (Kristin Scott Thomas)
 Won - National Board of Review (1996) Special Recognition for Excellence in Filmmaking

References

External links
 
 

1990s American films
1990s British films
1995 films
1995 romantic drama films
1990s English-language films
American romantic drama films
British romantic drama films
Films based on British novels
British historical romance films
American historical romance films
Romantic period films
Incest in film
Films set in country houses
Films set in the 19th century
Films directed by Philip Haas
The Samuel Goldwyn Company films
Films about rape